Gwynfryn Richards was a Welsh Anglican priest   and author  in the second half of the  20th century.

Born on 10 September 1902  and educated at Jesus College, Oxford, he was ordained in  1931. After  curacies in Llanrhos and Aberystwyth he became Rector of Llanllyfni in 1938, a post he held for 11 years. Next he was Vicar of Conwy and then Rural Dean of Arllechwedd.

He  was Archdeacon of Bangor before being appointed Dean of Bangor in 1962. He retired in 1971 and died on 30 October 1992.

References

1902 births
1992 deaths
Alumni of Jesus College, Oxford
Church in Wales archdeacons
Deans of Bangor